Scott David Berrier is a lieutenant general in the United States Army who serves as the Director of the Defense Intelligence Agency. Berrier was confirmed by the United States Senate as the 22nd Director of the Defense Intelligence Agency on July 30, 2020, replacing the retiring Lieutenant General Robert P. Ashley Jr. He previously served as the Deputy Chief of Staff of the Army G-2 (intelligence). He received his officer's commission in 1983 through the ROTC program at the University of Wisconsin–Stevens Point.

Education
Berrier holds a Bachelor of Science in History from the University of Wisconsin-Stevens Point in Stevens Point, Wisconsin, a Master of Science in General Studies from Central Michigan University in Mount Pleasant, Michigan, and a Master of Science in Strategic Studies from the  United States Army War College in Carlisle Barracks, Pennsylvania.

Military career

Operational deployments
 Deputy Chief of Staff, Intelligence, International Security Assistance Force (later Resolute Support) North Atlantic Treaty Organization; Deputy Director, J-2, United States Forces-Afghanistan, Operation Enduring Freedom and Freedom Sentinel.
 Intelligence Officer, CJ-2, United States Forces-Iraq, Operation Iraqi Freedom
 Director of Intelligence, CJ-2, Combined Task Force-76, Operation Enduring Freedom
 Commander, 110th Military Intelligence Battalion, 10th Mountain Division (Light); Director of Intelligence, CJ-2, Combined Joint TaskForce-180, Operation Enduring Freedom
 Director of Intelligence, J-2, Special Operations Command Central, Operation Enduring Freedom in Qatar.

Personal life
Berrier and his divorced wife Annie have two sons, Cole and Connor. Cole and his wife Mika work in the office of Senator Brian Schatz. Berrier's son Connor is a United States Navy Lieutenant and Naval Intelligence Officer currently serving as Flag Aide for the Navy N2/6.

Dates of rank

Awards and decorations

References

Living people
University of Wisconsin–Stevens Point alumni
Central Michigan University alumni
United States Army soldiers
United States Army generals
United States Army War College alumni
United States Army personnel of the War in Afghanistan (2001–2021)
United States Army personnel of the Iraq War
Recipients of the Distinguished Service Medal (US Army)
Recipients of the Defense Superior Service Medal
Recipients of the Legion of Merit
Military intelligence
Year of birth missing (living people)